Lights and Shadows is a 2012 South Korean retro-drama series, starring Ahn Jae-wook, Nam Sang-mi, Lee Pil-mo and Son Dam-bi. It aired on MBC from November 28, 2011 to July 3, 2012 on Mondays and Tuesdays at 21:55 for 64 episodes.

The series was originally planned for 50 episodes, but it was extended to 64 due to high ratings.

Plot
It tells the story of Kang Ki-tae who came from a wealthy family and became the first national entertainer during the Vietnam War in the 1970s and 1980s.

Cast

Main characters
Ahn Jae-wook as Kang Ki-tae
Nam Sang-mi as Lee Jung-hye
Lee Pil-mo as Cha Soo-hyuk
Son Dam-bi as Yoo Chae-young

Supporting characters
Jun Kwang-ryul as Jang Chul-hwan
Lee Jong-won as Jo Myung-kook
Sung Ji-ru as Shin Jung-goo
Shin Da-eun as Kang Myung-hee
Son Jin-young as Hong Soo-bong
Ahn Gil-kang as Noh Sang-taek
Lee Se-chang as Choi Sung-won
Kim Hee-won as Yang Tae-sung
Ryu Dam as Yang Dong-chul
Jun Gook-hwan as Kang Man-shik
Park Won-sook as Park Kyung-ja
Kim Mi-kyung as Kim Geum-rye
Seo Seung-man as Johnny Boy
Kim Dong-gyoon as Cherry Boy
Ha Jae-sook as Lee Kyung-sook
Lee Ah-yi as Kim Gye-soon
Narsha as Lee Jung-ja
Han Ki-woong as Gi-woong
Jo Mi-ryung as Soon-ae
Heo Ga-yoon as Hyun-kyung
Hong Jin-young as Yoon Ji-hye
Cha Tae-hyun as drunkard (cameo, ep 2) 
Seungri as Ahn Jae-su (cameo, ep 9-10)
 Kim Gyu-ri

Awards and nominations

International broadcast
 It aired in Vietnam on VTC9 - Let's Viet beginning February 22, 2014, under the title Ánh sáng và bóng tối.

References

External links
 Lights and Shadows official MBC website 
 

2011 South Korean television series debuts
2012 South Korean television series endings
MBC TV television dramas
Korean-language television shows
South Korean musical television series
Television shows written by Choi Wan-kyu